Pablo Haro Hernanz (born 17 June 1997) is a Spanish footballer who plays for Real Murcia as a right winger.

Club career
Born in Segovia, Castile and León, Haro moved to Seville, Andalusia at early age and represented UD Bellavista and AD Nervión as a youth. He made his first team debut for the latter on 7 February 2016, playing the last nine minutes of a 2–1 Primera Andaluza away win against La Barrera CF.

On 13 August 2016, Haro signed for Tercera División side CD Utrera, after a trial period. On 8 July 2019, he joined UD Las Palmas and was assigned to the reserves in Segunda División B.

Haro made his first team debut for the Canarians on 17 December 2019, starting in a 2–0 away defeat of CD Castellón, for the season's Copa del Rey. He made his Segunda División debut the following 14 January, coming on as a late substitute for Fabio González in a 0–1 home loss against Real Zaragoza.

On 11 August 2020, Haro joined Real Murcia in the third division.

References

External links

1997 births
Living people
People from Segovia
Sportspeople from the Province of Segovia
Footballers from Castile and León
Spanish footballers
Association football wingers
Segunda División players
Segunda División B players
Tercera División players
Divisiones Regionales de Fútbol players
UD Las Palmas Atlético players
UD Las Palmas players
Real Murcia players